Jorge Eduardo Velasco Mackenzie (16 January 1949 – 24 September 2021) was an Ecuadorian writer and professor. His most popular novel is El rincón de los justos (1983) about Guayaquil's lumpen proletariat.

Literary career
In 1975 Velasco Mackenzie published his first book, the collection of stories De vuelta al paraíso. In 1983 he published his first novel El rincón de los justos.

During the 1980s he gave several cultural promotional workshops sponsored by the Central Bank of Ecuador with Miguel Donoso Pareja, whom he had met after participating in a literary workshop in which Velasco developed the text of his novel about the Afro-Ecuadorian people. Tambores para una canción perdida (1986), with which he won the "Grupo de Guayaquil" Award, organized by the House of Ecuadorian Culture and whose jury was made up of Alfredo Pareja Díez Canseco, Antonio Cornejo Polar and Eliécer Cárdenas. Velasco and Donoso remained friends until Donoso's death.

In 1996 he won first place in the IV Biennial of the Ecuadorian Novel with the historical novel En nombre de un amor imaginario, in which he fictionalizes the events surrounding the French Geodesic Mission of 1736.

His novel La casa del fabulante (2014), recounts his experience in a detoxification center, which he attended due to his problems with alcoholism.

Bibliography

Novels
 El rincón de los justos (1983)
 Tambores para una canción perdida (1986)
 El ladrón de Levita (1990)
 En nombre de un amor imaginario (1996)
 Río de sombras (2003)
 Tatuaje de náufragos (2009)
 Hallado en la gruta (2012)
 La casa del fabulante (2014)

Short stories

 De vuelta al paraíso (1975)
 Como gato en tempestad (1977)
 Raymundo y la creación del mundo (1979)
 Músicos y amaneceres (1986)
 Clown y otros cuentos (1988)
 Desde una oscura vigilia (1992)
 La mejor edad para morir (2006)

Poetry

 Colectivo (1981)
 Algunos tambores que suenan así (1981)

Theater

 En esta casa de enfermos (1983)

References 

1949 births
2021 deaths
20th-century Ecuadorian writers
21st-century Ecuadorian writers
Ecuadorian male short story writers
Ecuadorian novelists
People from Guayaquil
Male novelists
20th-century short story writers
20th-century novelists
20th-century male writers
21st-century short story writers
21st-century novelists
21st-century male writers